Ecyroschema is a genus of longhorn beetles of the subfamily Lamiinae.

 Ecyroschema favosum Thomson, 1864
 Ecyroschema morini Téocchi, Jiroux, Sudre & Ture, 2008
 Ecyroschema multituberculatum Breuning, 1942
 Ecyroschema rugatum Pascoe, 1888
 Ecyroschema tuberculatum Breuning, 1948
 Ecyroschema zanzibaricum Adlbauer, Sudre & Téocchi, 2007

References

Crossotini